Onóra, Gaelic-Irish female given name.

It is sometimes rendered as Nora, Honor or Honoria.

Bearers of the name

 Onóra a' Burc, died 1383.
 Onóra Ní Gallchubhair, died 1546.
 Onóra Ní Buitiler, died 1577.
 Onóra Ní Briain, died 1579.
 Onóra Ní Briain, died 1583.
 Onóra Ní Bhriain Ara, died 1594.
 Onóra Ní Ní Briain, died 1600.
 Onora Sylvia O'Neill, Baroness O'Neill of Bengarve, philosopher and member of the House of Lords, born 1941.

External links
 http://medievalscotland.org/kmo/AnnalsIndex/Feminine/Onora.shtml

Irish-language feminine given names